KIUP (930 AM) is a radio station broadcasting a sports format. Licensed to Durango, Colorado, United States, the station serves the Four Corners area. The station is currently owned by Four Corners Broadcasting, LLC and features programming from ESPN Radio.

References

External links
Official Website

IUP
Sports radio stations in the United States
Radio stations established in 1983